Rudolf VI of Baden (died 21 March 1372) was Margrave of Baden-Baden and Count of Eberstein from 1353 to 1372.

Life
He was the elder son of Frederick III and Margareta of Baden. Under Rudolf VI Baden was again united in 1361, since the other lines had expired. Under his rule the Margraves of Baden were recognized for the first time as princeps regni (Reichsfürst).

Family and children
He married Matilde of Sponheim, daughter of Count John III of Sponheim and had the following children:
 Bernard I, Margrave of Baden-Baden (1364 – 5 April 1431, Baden).
 Rudolf VII, Margrave of Baden-Baden  (d. 1391).
 Matilde (d. 3 August 1425, Schleusingen), married 4 July 1376 to Count Henry of Henneberg.

See also
List of rulers of Baden

This article is translated from that on the German Wikipedia

Margraves of Baden-Baden
1372 deaths
Year of birth unknown
Place of birth unknown